The Greater Sacramento area refers to a metropolitan region in Northern California comprising either the U.S. Census Bureau defined Sacramento–Roseville–Arden-Arcade metropolitan statistical area or the larger Sacramento–Roseville combined statistical area, the latter of which consists of seven counties, namely Sacramento, Yolo, Placer, El Dorado, Sutter, Yuba, and Nevada counties.

Straddling the Central Valley and Sierra Nevada regions of California, Greater Sacramento is anchored by the state capital of Sacramento, the political center of California. Greater Sacramento also contains sites of natural beauty including Lake Tahoe, the largest alpine lake in North America and numerous ski and nature resorts. It is also located in one of the world's most important agricultural areas. The region's eastern counties are located in Gold Country, site of the California Gold Rush.

Since the late 20th century, it has been one of the fastest growing urban regions in the United States as Sacramento continues to emerge as a distinct metropolitan area. In the 1990s, the metro area experienced a growth of just over 20%, with subsequent growth remaining above 10% per decade. In the 2020 Census, the metropolitan region had a population of 2,680,831.

Regional composition
The Greater Sacramento area is composed of seven counties, two metropolitan statistical areas and one micropolitan area. The following counties are located in the Greater Sacramento area:
 El Dorado County, California
 Nevada County, California
 Placer County, California
 Sacramento County, California
 Sutter County, California
 Yolo County, California
 Yuba County, California

El Dorado, Placer, Sacramento, and Yolo counties compose the Sacramento–Roseville-Folsom, California, Metropolitan Statistical Area. Sutter and Yuba counties compose the Yuba City Metropolitan Statistical Area, known as the Yuba–Sutter area. Nevada County composes the Truckee–Grass Valley Micropolitan Area.

Overview

Greater Sacramento straddles two key regions of California, the Central Valley and the Sierra Nevada mountains and is overlapped by the cultural influences of three areas, the Bay Area, Eastern California and Northern California. An increasing phenomenon taking shape in Greater Sacramento is growth of urban sprawl as Sacramento and its metropolitan area continue to expand. The growth is due in part to first, higher costs of living in the Bay Area which have caused commuters to move as far as Yolo and Sacramento counties and more recently, growth and rising living costs in the core of Sacramento, building up more areas in the surrounding counties for commuters. Local and state governments are trying to prevent destruction of forests and open land and curbing the spread before Sacramento faces an urban sprawl crisis as the Greater Los Angeles Area has.

Sacramento is the largest city in the metropolitan area, home to approximately 500,000 people, making it the sixth-largest city in California and the 35th largest in the United States. It has been the state capital of California since 1851 and has played an important role in the history of California. When gold was discovered in nearby Sutter's Mill in Coloma, Sacramento became a boom town luring in migrants making their way from San Francisco to the gold fields of the Sierras. Although it did not become the financial and cultural center of Northern California, titles that were given to San Francisco, Sacramento became the largest transportation hub of not only Northern California, but also the West Coast following the completion of the First Transcontinental Railroad. Sacramento today continues to be one of the largest rail hubs in North America, and its rail station is one of the busiest in the United States. In 2002, Time Magazine featured an article recognizing Sacramento as the most diverse and integrated city in America. Government (state and federal) jobs are still the largest sector of employment in the city and the city council does considerable effort to keep state agencies from moving outside the city limits. The remainder of Sacramento County is suburban in general with most of the working population commuting to Downtown Sacramento and with a smaller proportion commuting all the way to the Bay Area.

Yolo County is a mixture of an agricultural area and commuter region, with most of its working population commuting either to the Bay Area or Sacramento for work. It is home to the University of California, Davis, campus, the northernmost UC campus and only UC campus in the Greater Sacramento region. 

El Dorado and Placer Counties form the remainder of the inner core of Greater Sacramento and are composed of the Sierra Nevada foothills and mountains. The western areas of the counties are composed of commuter suburbs, with Roseville in Placer County being Sacramento's most populous edge city. The Sierra foothills mostly contain residential acreage properties and small farms. The easternmost areas border Lake Tahoe and are home to numerous ski resorts and towns such as South Lake Tahoe, site of the Heavenly Mountain Resort, which are popular in winter months and nature camps and resorts in summer months. Placer County has been an important mining area not only for gold, but also other minerals and granite. It is also the site of Squaw Valley, which hosted the 1960 Winter Olympics, which has been up to date, the only Winter Olympic Games to be held in California and the US West Coast and the smallest city to host an Olympics.

The Yuba–Sutter area consists of Yuba and Sutter counties and is a primarily agricultural area, although the southern area is more suburban in character. It is home to Sunsweet Growers, which owns the world's largest dried fruit plant in Yuba City. Nevada County, like El Dorado and Placer Counties, borders Lake Tahoe and contains numerous ski resorts such as the Boreal Mountain Resort, but is more rural than the former two counties and is an important gold mining area. The Donner Memorial State Park is located in the county, where the ill-fated Donner Party was trapped in winter storms in 1846–47 while attempting to make it to California on a poorly organized trip.

Douglas County, Nevada was recently briefly added to the Sacramento Combined Statistical Area. As Greater Sacramento continues to grow beyond its inner region, Western Nevada continues to be influenced by Sacramento and California and their cultures. However, Douglas County has since been removed again from the Sacramento CSA, and transferred to the Reno-Carson City-Fernley, NV CSA.

Geography and climate

Geography

The western half of Greater Sacramento is centered on the Central Valley, one of the most vital agricultural areas in the country. The Sierra Nevada and its foothills compose the eastern portion of the region. Yolo County contains a large flood control basin. The Sacramento River and the American River are major rivers that form a deepwater port connected to the San Francisco Bay by a channel through the Sacramento River Delta. Coniferous and oak-dominated woodland are prevalent in the Sierra Nevada and the Lake Tahoe area.

Climate
Sacramento and the valley area have a Mediterranean climate (Köppen Csa), characterized by damp to wet, cool winters and hot, dry summers. The wet season is generally October through April. Summer heat is often moderated by a sea breeze known as the "delta breeze" which comes through the Sacramento–San Joaquin River Delta from the San Francisco Bay. January is the coolest month for the entire region with an average maximum of 41.0 °F (5.0 °C) and an average minimum of 15.1 °F (-9.4 °C) in Lake Tahoe.

The eastern portion of Greater Sacramento experiences a more varied climate with 90 °F (32.2 °C) temperatures in August to below freezing temperatures in winter. In higher elevations, freezing temperatures have been recorded every month. In the winter, below freezing temperatures are common in Sacramento and lower valley elevations although snowfall is scarce and usually melts on ground contact with significant snowfall occurring roughly every 3–5 years. However, blizzard conditions in winter storms can be common in the higher elevations.

Communities

Incorporated places

 Places with more than 400,000 inhabitants
 Sacramento
 Places with 100,000 to 200,000 inhabitants
 Elk Grove
 Roseville
 Places with 50,000 to 100,000 inhabitants
 Citrus Heights
 Davis
 Folsom
 Rancho Cordova
 Rocklin
 West Sacramento
 Woodland
 Yuba City

 Places with 10,000 to 50,000 inhabitants
 Auburn
 Galt
 Grass Valley
 Lincoln
 Marysville
 Placerville
 South Lake Tahoe
 Truckee
 Places with fewer than 10,000 inhabitants
 Colfax
 Isleton
 Live Oak
 Loomis
 Nevada City
 Wheatland
 Winters

Census-designated places

 Alta Sierra
 Antelope
 Arden-Arcade
 Beale Air Force Base
 Challenge–Brownsville
 Cameron Park
 Carmichael
 Diamond Springs
 Dollar Point
 El Dorado Hills
 Elverta
 Esparto
 Fair Oaks
 Florin
 Foothill Farms
 Foresthill
 Fruitridge Pocket
 Georgetown
 Gold River
 Granite Bay
 Kings Beach
 La Riviera
 Lake of the Pines

 Lake Wildwood
 Lemon Hill
 Linda
 Loma Rica
 Meadow Vista
 North Auburn
 North Highlands
 Olivehurst
 Orangevale
 Parkway
 Penn Valley
 Plumas Lake
 Pollock Pines
 Rancho Murieta
 Rio Linda
 Rosemont
 Shingle Springs
 South Yuba City
 Sunnyside–Tahoe City
 Sutter
 Tahoe Vista
 Tierra Buena
 Vineyard
 Walnut Grove
 Wilton

Demographics

As of the 2020 census, there were 2,397,382 people residing within the MSA. The racial makeup was 52.5% White, 7.0% Black, 1.1% American Indian, 14.9% Asian, 0.9% Pacific Islander, 10.4% Other and 13.2% Two or More Races. 22.2% identified as Hispanic or Latino.

The median income for a household in the MSA in 2000 was $48,401, and the median income for a family was $57,112. Males had a median income of $43,572 versus $31,889 for females. The per capita income for the MSA was $23,508.

Transportation

Owing to its central location between the Bay Area and Nevada border, Greater Sacramento is a key transportation hub into Northern California. While the region doesn't have an extensive public transportation system as the San Francisco Bay Area, Greater Sacramento has had an earlier history of public mass transit and is served by a vast freeway system as well as some light rail.

Freeways and highways
Sacramento is served by numerous highways. Five highways merge in the Capital City Corridor, serving the immediate downtown Sacramento area. The major freeways of the Greater Sacramento area are Interstate 80, US Route 50, Interstate 5, and State Route 99, which serve the northern Tahoe area, southern Tahoe area, and valley areas, respectively, as well as forming the Capital City Corridor along with Interstate 80 Business. Outside downtown Sacramento, there is only one principal route that serves its respective area and there are smaller state routes as well. Freeways and highways in the Greater Sacramento areas include:

  Interstate 5
  Interstate 80
  Interstate 505
  U.S. Route 50
  U.S. Route 395
  Interstate 80 Business
  California State Route 12
  California State Route 16
  California State Route 20
  California State Route 28
  California State Route 45

  California State Route 49
  California State Route 65
  California State Route 70
  California State Route 89
  California State Route 99
  California State Route 104
  California State Route 113
  California State Route 128
  California State Route 160
  California State Route 174
  California State Route 193

  California State Route 220
  California State Route 244
  California State Route 267
  Nevada State Route 28
  Nevada State Route 88
  Nevada State Route 206
  Nevada State Route 207
  Nevada State Route 208
  Nevada State Route 756
  Nevada State Route 757
  Nevada State Route 759

Rail
Sacramento is the largest rail hub west of the Mississippi River and was the first terminus of the First transcontinental railroad before it extended to Oakland. The Sacramento Valley Station is the largest train station in the region, near Old Sacramento, and is connected by the Coast Starlight, California Zephyr, San Joaquins, Capitol Corridor and Thruway Motorcoach Amtrak routes. The Sacramento Regional Transit District is the local transit agency for Sacramento County and operates three light rail routes, the Blue Line, Green Line, and Gold Line, along  of right-of-way that serve Sacramento and its immediate suburbs. Other train stations in the Greater Sacramento area are Davis, Roseville, Rocklin, Auburn, Colfax and Truckee.

Air
The main airport servicing Greater Sacramento is the Sacramento International Airport north of downtown while the Sacramento Mather Airport, Sacramento Executive Airport and Minden–Tahoe Airports provide general aviation. The Reno-Tahoe International Airport in Reno provides more direct access to Lake Tahoe than Sacramento International. For a wider range of destinations, residents must travel down to San Francisco International Airport, the largest airport in Northern California and 10th largest in the United States.

Bus
Greater Sacramento is served by extensive bus systems that link the region to the Reno and Bay Area metropolitan areas. The Sacramento Regional Transit District operates bus lines in Sacramento County and Yolobus serves Yolo County while providing connections to downtown Sacramento and northern Solano County in the Bay Area. El Dorado Transit links El Dorado County with downtown Sacramento and the city's western suburbs. Placer County Transit and Roseville Transit link Sacramento with Placer County with the latter providing direct connection from Roseville to Sacramento. The Yuba-Sutter Transit provides bus service in the Yuba–Sutter area and direct connection to downtown Sacramento on weekdays. Gold Country Stage and Tahoe Truckee Area Rapid Transit serve Nevada County and transfer service to Auburn to Sacramento is provided. Greyhound, Megabus, Flixbus, and Amtrak provide long-distance bus lines to Greater Sacramento.

Higher education

Greater Sacramento's higher education system consists of the northernmost University of California campus, University of California, Davis, and the California State University, Sacramento ("Sac State"), as well as several community colleges in the region.

Community colleges:
 American River College
 Cosumnes River College
 Folsom Lake College
 Lake Tahoe Community College
 Sacramento City College
 Sierra College
 Woodland Community College
 Yuba College
California State University:
 California State University, Sacramento
University of California:
 UC Davis

Private:
 Alliant International University
 The Art Institute of California – Sacramento
 Drexel University (Sacramento campus)
 International Academy of Design & Technology – Sacramento
 Lincoln Law School of Sacramento
 McGeorge School of Law (part of University of the Pacific)
 National University
 University of Northern California, Lorenzo Patiño School of Law
 University of Phoenix - Sacramento Valley Campus
 University of Sacramento
 University of the Pacific, Sacramento Campus
 William Jessup University

Politics

In addition to being home of the state capital of California, Greater Sacramento is considered a politically competitive area with no major political party having a majority over the region. Sacramento and Yolo counties have large Democratic pluralities and have had Democratic majorities since the 2008 presidential election, attributed to the former county being mainly urban and the latter home to the strongly Democratic university town of Davis. El Dorado, Placer, Yuba, and Sutter counties are predominantly Republican while Nevada County, despite a history of being held by Republican candidates, reflects the metropolitan area's competitiveness with pluralities between the two major parties.

Sports teams

Professional sports 

The only major professional sports team based in the Greater Sacramento area are the Sacramento Kings, who play at the Golden 1 Center in Downtown Sacramento. 

Prior to 2009, the Sacramento Monarchs of the Women's National Basketball Association (WNBA) were also based at the Sleep Train Arena (then known as ARCO Arena), and were one of the most successful WNBA teams until the team folded.

Greater Sacramento is the only metropolitan area in the West Coast and in California to have ever hosted a Winter Olympic Games when Squaw Valley hosted the 1960 Winter Olympics, becoming the smallest city to ever host an Olympic Games, a title it still holds. Squaw Valley was the second Olympic games hosted in California and the only one not held in Los Angeles, where the 1932 and 1984 Summer Olympics were hosted and was the only Winter Olympics held west of the Mississippi River until the 2002 Winter Olympics in Salt Lake City.

Minor league teams 
Greater Sacramento is also home to minor or secondary league sports teams. Sacramento Republic FC is a soccer team that plays in the USL Championship at Papa Murphy's Park, which is located on the grounds of Cal Expo. A new stadium in downtown Sacramento is planned to be completed ahead of the club's move to Major League Soccer (MLS).

The Sacramento River Cats are a triple-A baseball team affiliated with the San Francisco Giants. The team plays in West Sacramento at Sutter Health Park, which is located just across the Sacramento River from downtown Sacramento.

NCAA Division I College Sports
 Sacramento State Hornets
 UC Davis Aggies

See also

 California census statistical areas
 Northern California
 San Francisco Bay Area

References

 
Metropolitan areas of California
Sac
Geography of the Central Valley (California)
Sac
Northern California